Ian MacIntyre, WS (27 November 1869 – 29 June 1946) was a Scotland international rugby union player. He became the 26th President of the Scottish Rugby Union. For a period he was also a Unionist Party MP for Edinburgh West. He was also a Writer to the Signet.

Rugby Union career

Amateur career

MacIntyre started his rugby union at his Fettes College school. When he started studying law at the university, he then played for Edinburgh University. After university, MacIntyre played for Edinburgh Wanderers.

Provincial career

He was capped by Edinburgh District in the 1899 inter-city match. He was playing for Edinburgh Wanderers when he was called up.

International career

MacIntyre was capped 6 times for Scotland between 1890 and 1891.

Referee career

He refereed in the Scottish Unofficial Championship.

Administrative career

MacIntyre became the 26th President of the Scottish Rugby Union. He served the 1899–1900 term in office.

Law career

He was educated at the University of Edinburgh, where he obtained an M. A. and LLB. He was admitted as a Writer to the Signet in 1893.

Macintyre's legal practice was concerned with financial and commercial undertakings.

Political career

He was a member of Edinburgh Town Council from 1918 to 1920.

He first contested the Edinburgh West seat in 1923, but was beaten by the Liberal incumbent Vivian Phillips by 2,232 votes.  He gained the seat in 1924, pushing Phillipps into third place, and finishing just over one thousand votes ahead of the second-placed Labour candidate. He did not stand again in 1929, when Labour gained the seat.

Family
MacIntyre married in 1896 Ida van der Gucht. They children, including two sons and four daughters:
 Duncan MacIntyre (1902–1930) 
 Marjorie Linklater (1909–1997), wife of Eric Linklater, was a fervent Scottish Nationalist and campaigned for Winnie Ewing, the arts and the environment. MacIntyre's grandson is the journalist Magnus Linklater.
 Alastair Macintyre (1913–1979)
 a daughter married Bonfield

In 1932, MacIntyre was arrested and charged by Kenyan officials, along with his daughter Mrs Bonfield, on a charge of trying to kidnap two of his grandchildren. The charges were dropped at the Supreme Court of Kenya.

References

External links

 

1869 births
1946 deaths
Members of the Parliament of the United Kingdom for Edinburgh constituencies
Unionist Party (Scotland) MPs
UK MPs 1924–1929
Scottish rugby union players
Scotland international rugby union players
Presidents of the Scottish Rugby Union
Edinburgh Wanderers RFC players
Edinburgh University RFC players
Edinburgh District (rugby union) players
Scottish Unofficial Championship referees
Scottish rugby union referees
Rugby union players from Greenock
People educated at Fettes College
Scottish solicitors